The Ranfurly Shield, colloquially known as the Log o' Wood, is perhaps the most prestigious trophy in New Zealand's domestic rugby union competition. First played for in 1904, the Ranfurly Shield is based on a challenge system, rather than a league or knockout competition as with most football trophies. The holding union must defend the Shield in challenge matches, and if a challenger defeats them, they become the new holder of the Shield.

Auckland began the decade as shield holders, before losing to Waikato in 1993 after a record 61 defences spanning from 1985. The shield changed hands seven times between four teams, ending up in Waikato's hands at the closing of the decade. Taranaki notably won the shield in 1996, holding it for only one successful defence. This was their fourth Ranfurly Shield stint, and their first since 1965.

Fixtures

1990

1991

1992

1993

1994

1995

1996

1997

1998

1999

References

External links
https://www.provincial.rugby/ranfurly-shield/
https://www.rugbyhistory.co.nz/ranfurly-shield

Ranfurly Shield
Rugby union trophies and awards
New Zealand rugby union competitions
1990 in New Zealand rugby union
1991 in New Zealand rugby union
1992 in New Zealand rugby union
1993 in New Zealand rugby union
1994 in New Zealand rugby union
1995 in New Zealand rugby union
1996 in New Zealand rugby union
1997 in New Zealand rugby union
1998 in New Zealand rugby union
1999 in New Zealand rugby union